Charles Joseph Santore (March 16, 1935 – August 11, 2019) was an American illustrator best known for his children's books. His work is on display permanently at the Brandywine River Museum of Art and the Museum of Modern Art. He won the Hamilton King award from the New York Society of Illustrators in 1972. His book William the Curious was honored in the 1998 Storytelling World 'Stories for Pre-Adolescent Listeners' category. His most popular works include his celebrity portraits for TV Guide. Santore died on August 11, 2019.

Background
Santore was born in Philadelphia in 1935 and attended the Museum School of Art (which is now the University of the Arts) where he studied illustration. When he graduated in 1956, he served in the Army and then returned to Philadelphia to work in a small art studio. He started to get assignments from the N.W. Ayer Agency and his first editorial assignment was for the old Saturday Evening Post headquartered in Philadelphia.

Career beginnings
In 1985, he was approached by Running Press to illustrate a new version of "Tales of Peter Rabbit" by Beatrix Potter. It was a life changing experience as he realized how different it was to illustrate an entire book rather than just one image.

Personal life 
Santore married Olenka (née Litynski) in 1963. Together, their Philadelphia home featured a collection of early American folk paintings. Santore died in 2019 at the age of 84; he was predeceased by his wife four months earlier. The couple were survived by their daughter, two sons, and three grandchildren.

Illustrations
Each book took him two years to complete. His work appeared in publications such as Redbook, Ladies' Home Journal, Esquire, Cosmopolitan, National Geographic, and many others. His most popular works were celebrity portraits he did for TV Guide magazine covers.

Antique Authority

Santore was also a collector and authority on antiques, with particular focus on Windsor seating. He lectured and served as an advisor at universities and museums, including Yale University, University of Pennsylvania, and Mount Vernon, and served as a consultant for auction houses. His books The Windsor Style in America: A Pictorial Study of the History and Regional Characteristics of the Most Popular Furniture Form of Eighteenth-Century America, 1730-1830, 1981, and The Windsor Style in America, 1730-1840, volume two, 1987 are definitive resources.

Permanent collections
His illustrations are part of the permanent collections at many locations including: the Brandywine River Museum of Art in Chadds Ford, Pennsylvania, the Free Library of Philadelphia, the Museum of Modern Art in New York City, The United States Department of the Interior, the Smithsonian National Portrait Gallery in Washington, D.C. and many private collections.

Awards
Hamilton King Award from the New York Society of Illustrators
Gold medal from the New York Society of Publication Designers
"Edgar" from the Mystery Writers of America

References

External links

1935 births
2019 deaths
American children's book illustrators
American magazine illustrators
Artists from Philadelphia
Military personnel from Philadelphia
United States Army soldiers
University of the Arts (Philadelphia) alumni